Refereed by Jeremiah Fitzgerald (Rathkeale, Limerick)
The 1959 All-Ireland Senior Hurling Championship was the 73rd staging of the All-Ireland Senior Hurling Championship, the Gaelic Athletic Association's premier inter-county hurling tournament. The championship began on 12 April 1959 and ended on 4 October 1959.

The championship was won by Waterford who secured the title following a 3-12 to 1-10 defeat of Kilkenny in the All-Ireland final. This was their second All-Ireland title, their first in eleven championship seasons. It remains their last All-Ireland triumph.

Tipperary were the defending champions but were defeated by Waterford in the Munster semi-final.

Provincial changes

Due to a lack of competition in their own province, the Galway County Board proposed a regrading to junior status in January 1958. This led to a wider debate regarding the structure of the championship. The abolition of the provincial system and the introduction of an open draw was rejected. Galway put forward their own proposal for the creation of a new "province" consisting of Galway, Clare, Laois, Offaly and Westmeath, however, this was also rejected. The possibility of starting the National Hurling League in April in an effort to give Galway some game time before the start of the championship was also discussed. At a meeting of the Munster Council on 10 January 1959 it was decided to invite Galway to participate in all grades of hurling in Munster on a temporary basis. This decision was later ratified at the GAA Congress.

Results

Leinster Senior Hurling Championship

First round

Second round

Semi-finals

Final

Munster Senior Hurling Championship

First round

Semi-finals

Final

All-Ireland Senior Hurling Championship

Finals

Championship statistics

Top scorers

Top scorers overall

Top scorers in a single game

Miscellaneous

 In the Munster semi-final Waterford led All-Ireland champions Tipperary by 8-2 to 0-0 at half-time. Sports broadcaster Michael O'Hehir, who was commentating on another game, read the half-time result live on the radio but advised listeners not to pay any heed as he believed it to be a hoax.
 Waterford qualified for a third consecutive Munster final for the first time in their history.
 The All-Ireland final went to a replay for the first time since 1934.  It held the record as the last replayed championship decider until 2012.
 Phil Grimes became the first and only Waterford player to win two All-Ireland medals. He did not play in his county's first championship triumph in 1948, however, he played in the opening round of the championship and was entitled to a winners' medal.

Player facts

Debutantes
The following players made their début in the 1959 championship:

Sources

 Corry, Eoghan, The GAA Book of Lists (Hodder Headline Ireland, 2005).
 Donegan, Des, The Complete Handbook of Gaelic Games (DBA Publications Limited, 2005).
 Nolan, Pat, Flashbacks: A Half Century of Cork Hurling (The Collins Press, 2000).
 Sweeney, Éamonn, Munster Hurling Legends (The O'Brien Press, 2002).

References

1959
All-Ireland Senior Hurling Championship